The Mysterious Mirror, aka The Mystic Mirror is a 1928 German silent fantasy film directed by Carl Hoffmann and Richard Teschner, and starring Fee Malten, Fritz Rasp and Rina De Liguoro. The film was about a magic mirror which allowed the person looking into it to see his or her future, a theme that appeared similarly in the 1945 British horror film Dead of Night. The magazine Film und Volk, which was invariably hostile to UFA releases, described it as "about the limit of what an audience could be expected to tolerate in the way of stale Gothic Romance and unlikely psychology".

Plot
A mirror in a creepy old Bavarian castle has the magical ability to reveal the future of whoever looks into it while the full moon shines brightly. A series of characters looks into the glass to learn their fate, and most are unhappy with what they learn. In the end, the hero smashes the glass and then commits suicide. After he is dead, the mirror magically reassembles itself into a whole as before.

Cast
 Fee Malten as Anna
 Fritz Rasp as reicher Mann
 Rina De Liguoro as Freundin des reichen Mannes
 Eduard von Winterstein as Schloßverwalter
 Dante Cappelli as Schloßkastellan
 Wolf Albach-Retty as Bildhauer
 Max Magnus as Sein Freund
 Alice Kempen as Großmagd
 Heinrich Gretler as Großknecht

Production
Co-director Hoffmann, being more of a cinematographer, was more at home handling the technical effects involved in filmmaking and preferred to allow a co-director (such as Teschner) to work with the actors. His career involved working on films with directors including Fritz Lang and F.W. Murnau. Actor Fritz Rasp played villains in a number of films including Metropolis and, in the 1960s, several German Edgar Wallace crime thrillers.

References

Bibliography
 Kreimeier, Klaus. The Ufa Story: A History of Germany's Greatest Film Company, 1918–1945. University of California Press, 1999.

External links

1928 films
Films of the Weimar Republic
1920s fantasy films
German silent feature films
German fantasy films
Films directed by Carl Hoffmann
UFA GmbH films
German black-and-white films
1920s German films